The Fox Series Channel or simply Fox was a Middle Eastern version of the American Fox Channel. It launched in 2008. The channel was relaunched as Fox on March 1, 2011.

Tuning parameters

The DVB-S IRD tuning parameters for Fox Series are:

Programming

External links
 
 Fox Series homepage

Fox Channel
Rotana Group
Women's interest channels